Robert Anthony Smith, known as Big Bert, is an American record producer, songwriter and musician. He made a break in the industry when Rodney "Darkchild" Jerkins consulted him to join his Darkchild collective in the late 1990s. He went on to co-produce alongside Jerkins on tracks for bands like B2K and the Spice Girls, prior to contributing to projects by Dave Hollister, Toni Braxton, and Kelly Rowland in the early to mid-2000s.

During the production of Brandy's Full Moon album, he became romantically involved with the singer. The couple began a relationship in mid-2001 but announced it in February 2002, when Norwood revealed that she was expecting a child. A year after the birth of their daughter Sy'rai Iman Smith (June 16, 2002), the couple announced their separation on MTV reality series Special Delivery. In 2004 Smith said the pair never legally wed but portrayed the notion of nuptials to preserve Norwood's public image. Smith is CEO of NOMA Records, an independent record label and lives in Florida with his family. He and his wife Xochitl Jacques-Smith work together and have five children, Rain, Soleil, Sade, Robert (Tico) and Judah.

 Michael Jackson - Invincible (2001)
 Brandy - Full Moon (2001)
 "When You Touch Me" (co-production)
 "Wow"
 Dave Hollister – Things in the Game Done Changed (2002)
 "Baby Do Those Things"
 "I'm Wrong"
 "It's Okay"
 Jennifer Lopez – Rebirth (2005)
 "Ryde or Die"
 Jessica Simpson – Irresistible (2001)
 "Imagination" (co-production)
 Kelly Rowland – Simply Deep (2002)
 "Love/Hate"
 Kiley Dean – Simple Girl (2002)
 "Better Than the Day"
 "Confused"
 "Should I"
 Nina Sky – Starting Today (2010)
 "Curtain Call"
 Olivia – Behind Closed Doors (2005)
 "Never Too Far"
 Ray J – This Ain't a Game (2001)
 "Crazy" (co-production)
 Spice Girls – Forever (2000)
 "Get Down with Me" (co-production)
 Tarralyn Ramsey – Tarralyn (2004)
 "Take Me Away"
 Toni Braxton – More Than a Woman (2002)
 "Always"
 "Selfish"
 Trin-i-tee 5:7 – The Kiss (2002)
 "All My Life"
 "I Wish"

References

American male songwriters
African-American songwriters
American record producers
Living people
1979 births
21st-century African-American people
20th-century African-American people